Goran Ristić (born 25 February 1978) is a retired Slovenian football striker.

References

1978 births
Living people
Slovenian footballers
NK Mura players
NK Šmartno 1928 players
NK Nafta Lendava players
ND Mura 05 players
Association football forwards
Slovenian expatriate footballers
Expatriate footballers in Austria
Slovenian expatriate sportspeople in Austria
Slovenian PrvaLiga players